The Michigan Senate elections of 2018 took place on November 6, 2018, alongside elections to be Michigan's governor, Class I United States Senator, Attorney General, Secretary of State as well elections for Michigan's 14 seats in the United States House of Representatives and all 110 seats in the Michigan House of Representatives; to elect the 38 members that will comprise the Michigan Senate. The Republican, Democratic and Libertarian parties chose their nominees in a partisan primary on August 7, 2018. The Working Class Party, U.S. Taxpayers Party, Green Party and Natural Law Party chose their nominees at state party conventions.

Term-limited members
Under the Michigan Constitution, members of the state Senate are able to serve only two four-year terms, and members of the House of Representatives are limited to three two-year terms. Michigan has what are considered the toughest term-limits in the country. After the 2018 mid-term elections, nearly 70 percent of the state Senate and 20 percent of the state House will be forced to leave office because of term-limits. The following members are prevented by term-limits from seeking re-election to the Senate in 2018. This list does not include members that are eligible for re-election, but instead chose to seek other office or voluntarily to retire.

Democrats (7)
1st District: Coleman Young II
2nd District: Bert Johnson
3rd District: Morris Hood III
6th District: Hoon-Yung Hopgood
9th District: Steve Bieda
11th District: Vincent Gregory
18th District: Rebekah Warren

Republicans (19)
7th District: Patrick Colbeck
8th District: Jack Brandenburg
10th District: Tory Rocca
12th District: Jim Marleau
14th District: David B. Robertson
15th District: Mike Kowall
19th District: Mike Nofs
21st District: John Proos
22nd District: Joe Hune
24th District: Rick Jones
25th District: Phil Pavlov
26th District: Tonya Schuitmaker
29th District: Dave Hildenbrand
30th District: Arlan Meekhof
31st District: Mike Green
33rd District: Judy Emmons
34th District: Goeff Hansen
35th District: Darwin L. Booher
38th District: Tom Casperson

Results

Closest races 
Seats where the margin of victory was under 10%:
  (gain)
  (gain)
  (gain)

General Election

Pending official certification by the Michigan Board of State Canvassers, the following candidates, listed alphabetically, advanced to the November general election.

District 1

District 2

District 3

District 4

District 5

District 6

District 7

District 8

District 9

District 10

District 11

District 12

District 13

District 14

District 15

District 16

District 17

District 18

District 19

District 20

District 21

District 22

District 23

District 24

District 25

District 26

District 27

District 28

District 29

District 30

District 31

District 32

District 33

District 34

District 35

District 36

District 37

District 38

Maps

See also
Michigan House of Representatives election, 2018

References

External links
2018 Michigan Primary Election Ballot

Senate
Michigan Senate elections
Michigan Senate
November 2018 events in the United States